Doug Stoner, a member of the Democratic Party, is a member of the Georgia House of Representatives, a former member of the Georgia State Senate, and a former candidate to be chairman of the Georgia Democratic Party. He ran in the 2018 Democratic primary for District 5's seat on the Georgia Public Service Commission, which is currently held by a Republican, Tricia Pridemore. Stoner lost the primary to Dawn Randolph on May 22, 2018.

Personal life and education
Stoner attended Campbell High School and Kennesaw State University. He has a wife, Della, and two children.

Political career
Stoner was elected to the Georgia House of Representatives in 2002, and to the Georgia Senate in 2004. Stoner served on the Economic Development, MARTOC, Retirement, State and Local Governmental, Operations, Transportation, and Urban Affairs committees.

Stoner is the owner of a Dairy Queen. Stoner also served as a senior business development manager at Akins, Ltd.

Stoner ran for Chairman of the Georgia Democratic Party in an August 2013 special election. He was endorsed by Atlanta Mayor Kasim Reed and former Governor Roy Barnes but lost to former State Representative DuBose Porter.

References

External links 
 Stoner's Twitter account
 DougStoner.com

Georgia (U.S. state) Democrats
Democratic Party members of the Georgia House of Representatives
21st-century American politicians
Living people
Year of birth missing (living people)